or OBS is a television company based in Ōita Prefecture, Japan.

Famous radio announcer and personality Toshio Nishimura used to appear on OBS. He is well known throughout the prefecture and is often referred to by his radio nickname "Bin Bin". He is also known for his English pronunciation. His most famous is quote is "I don't say Makudonarudo, I say McDarro!"

History
October 1, 1953 – Radio broadcasting started
July 7, 1958 – Television Broadcasting was started.
August 2004 – Current head office Digital Media Center completed
December 1, 2006 – Oita Main Station starts network's Digital terrestrial television broadcasting service.
March 31, 2008 – On a large scale operation, OBS moves to the new main building.
June 2008 – Toshio Nishimura died of cancer.
July 24, 2011 – Analog transmission ended.
April 2, 2012 – OBS gets involved in the "radiko" project.

Stations

Radio 
Oita (Main Station) JOGF 1098 kHz 500 kW; 93.3 MHz FM
Nakatsu 1557 kHz 100w
Hita 1557 kHz 100w
Saiki 1269 kHz 100w
Taketa 1557 kHz 100w
Yufuin 1098 kHz 100w

Analog Television
Oita (Main Station) JOGF-TV 5ch 3 kW

Digital Television (ID:3)
Oita (Main Station) JOGF-DTV 22ch 1 kW

Other links
OBS Official Site

Japan News Network
Television stations in Japan
Ōita Prefecture
Radio stations established in 1953
Television channels and stations established in 1958
Mass media in Ōita (city)
1953 establishments in Japan